The Versailles Saint-Quentin-en-Yvelines Observatory is an astronomical observatory affiliated with the Versailles Saint-Quentin-en-Yvelines University. Built in Guyancourt, France in 2009, it focuses on the fields of climate change and sustainable development.

See also 
 List of astronomical observatories

References

External links
 Official

Versailles
Buildings and structures in Versailles
French National Centre for Scientific Research
Versailles Saint-Quentin-en-Yvelines University
2009 establishments in France